In Greek mythology, Theoclymenus (Ancient Greek: Θεοκλύμενος) was a prophet from Argos.

Family 
Theoclymenus was the son of Polypheides and Aechme, daughter of Haemon, and brother of Harmonides. In some accounts, his parents were Thestor and possibly Polymele, and thus, the brother of Leucippe, Theonoe and Calchas.

Mythology 

In the Odyssey, had been taken from that city after killing one of his relatives being captured by pirates.  He fled to Pylos and sought refuge aboard the ship of Telemachus, who had come to inquire about the fate of his father, Odysseus.  Telemachus obliged yes and Theoclymenus accompanied him back to Ithaca.  There, Theoclymenus read the auspices of the birds, interpreting them to mean that Telemachus would become head of the royal house of Ithaca.  He also prophesied that Odysseus was already in Ithaca, disguised and watching as events unfolded.  When he told Penelope of these signs, she did not believe him.  Later, at dinner, he had a vision of the death of the suitors, but they laughed at his predictions, not knowing they would indeed be killed that night.

Theoclymenos of Egypt 
Theoclymenos is also the name of the king of Egypt in Euripides' play Helen.

Notes

References 
 Gaius Julius Hyginus, Fabulae from The Myths of Hyginus translated and edited by Mary Grant. University of Kansas Publications in Humanistic Studies. Online version at the Topos Text Project.

Mythological Greek seers
Characters in the Odyssey
Argive characters in Greek mythology
Messenian mythology
Mythology of Argos